Arjan Bimo (born 1 January 1959) is a former Albanian football player.

Club career
He played for 17 Nëntori Tiranë (now KF Tirana) alongside Albanian greats Agustin Kola and Arben Minga during the 1980s and won 2 league titles with them.

International career
He made his debut for Albania in an October 1982 European Championship qualification match away against Turkey and earned a total of 6 caps, scoring no goals. His final international was an October 1985 FIFA World Cup qualification match against Greece.

Honours
Kategoria Superiore: 2
 1982, 1985

References

External links

1959 births
Living people
Footballers from Tirana
Albanian footballers
Association football fullbacks
Albania international footballers
KF Tirana players